Kalani Thomas (born 18 April 2002 in Australia) is an Australian rugby union player who plays for the  in Super Rugby. His playing position is scrum-half. He was named in the Reds squad for the 2021 Super Rugby AU season.

Reference list

External links
itsrugby.co.uk Profile
Queensland Reds profile

2002 births
Australian rugby union players
Living people
Rugby union scrum-halves
Queensland Reds players